Velvet (also known as Galerías Velvet) is a Spanish drama television series created by Ramón Campos and Gema R. María and produced by Bambú Producciones for Antena 3. Its budget is estimated in 500,000 euros per episode. The main storyline of the show is the love story of Alberto Márquez (played by Miguel Ángel Silvestre), heir of Galerías Velvet, one of the most prestigious fashion houses in the Spain of the late 1950s, and Ana Ribera (Paula Echevarría), who works as a seamstress there.

Cast
This is the list of characters of the series.

Supporting characters

International broadcast
In the 2014 edition of MIPTV Media Market, the rights for Velvet were acquired by Italy's RAI and France's M6. RAI also got the rights for a remake. In Lithuania, it started airing on LNK on 1 June 2014. In Greece and Cyprus, it is airing on Nova Life and from 20 June is airing also from ANT1 and ANT1 Cyprus. In Finland, the series started airing in December 2015 on YLE Teema. In Slovenia the premiere was on RTVSLO on 15 May 2016 and in Slovakia it was on TV Doma on 4 July 2016. Czech republic Prima LOVETV on 13.10.2018

This series is also available on the Netflix streaming service in the USA, Latin America, Canada, Australia, Ireland, New Zealand, The Netherlands, Germany, the UK, and Thailand.

Spin-off

On 9 February 2017, subscription platform Movistar+ announced they had acquired the rights to produce a spin-off series of Velvet, titled Velvet Colección, which will be centered on the opening of a second Galerías Velvet store in Barcelona in 1967. Adrián Lastra as Pedro Infantes, Asier Etxeandia as Raúl de la Riva, Llorenç González as Jonás Infantes, Javier Rey as Mateo Ruiz Lagasca, Marta Hazas as Clara Montesinos, Diego Martín as Enrique Otegui, and Aitana Sánchez-Gijón as Blanca Soto reprise their roles; Paula Echevarría and José Sacristán also appear as Ana Ribera and Emilio López respectively in the first episode. New actors include Imanol Arias, Adriana Ozores, Mónica Cruz, Andrea Duro and Marta Torné. The series premiered on 21 September 2017.

Episodes

Series overview

Season 1 (2014)

Season 2 (2014–15)

Ratings 
 

| link2             = List of Velvet episodes#Season 1 (2014)
| episodes2         = 14
| start2            = 
| end2              = 
| startrating2      = 4.08
| endrating2        = 4.60
| viewers2          = |2}} 
}}

Awards and nominations 

|-
| align = "center" rowspan = "5" | 2014 || rowspan = "5" | 2nd  || colspan = "2" | Best Drama Series ||  || rowspan = "5" | 
|-
| colspan = "2" | Best Creation ||  
|-
| colspan = "2" | Best Direction ||  
|-
| Best Actress || Paula Echevarría || 
|-
| Best Actor || Miguel Ángel Silvestre ||  
|-
| align = "center" rowspan = "3" | 2015 || rowspan = "2" | 65th Fotogramas de Plata || Best TV Actress || Cecilia Freire ||  || rowspan = "2" | 
|-
| Best TV Actor || Asier Etxeandia || 
|-
| rowspan = "1" | 3rd  || Best Drama Actress || Paula Echevarría ||  ||  rowspan = "1" | 
|-
| align = "center" rowspan = "4" | 2016 || rowspan = "3" | 25th Actors and Actresses Union Awards || Best Television Actress in a Secondary Role || Cecilia Freire ||  || align = "center" rowspan = "3" | 
|-
| Best Television Actor in a Secondary Role || Asier Etxeandia || 
|-
| Best Television Actor in a Minor Role || Diego Martín || 
|-
| 4th  || Best Drama Actress || Paula Echevarría ||  || align = "center" rowspan = "1" | 
|-
|-
| align = "center" rowspan = "9" | 2017 || rowspan = "2" | 4th Feroz Awards || Best Supporting Actor in a TV Series || José Sacristán ||  || rowspan = "2" | 
|-
| Best Supporting Actress in a TV Series || Cecilia Freire || 
|-
| rowspan = "4" | 67th Fotogramas de Plata || colspan = "2" | Best Spanish TV Series ||  || rowspan = "4" | 
|-
| rowspan = "2" | Best TV Actress ||Paula Echevarría ||  
|-
| Cecilia Freire || 
|-
| Best TV Actor || Asier Etxeandia || 
|-
| rowspan = "3" | 26th Actors and Actresses Union Awards || Best Television Actor in a Leading Role || José Sacristán ||  || rowspan = "3" | 
|-
| Best Television Actor in a Secondary Role || Asier Etxeandia || 
|-
| Best Television Actor in a Minor Role || Adrián Lastra || 
|}

References

External links
 
 All episodes on AtresPlayer.com
 

2010s Spanish drama television series
2014 Spanish television series debuts
2016 Spanish television series endings
Antena 3 (Spanish TV channel) network series
Fashion-themed television series
Television series set in the 1950s
Television shows set in Madrid
Television series by Bambú Producciones